The Guaviare is a tributary of the Orinoco in Colombia. It flows together with the upper Orinoco (until here also called Río Parágua), which it clearly surpasses in length (altogether about 1760 km) and water flow. Thus, the Guaviare is hydrologically the main stream of the Orinoco system.

The Guaviare has its source in two other rivers, the Ariari and the Guayabero, which in turn have their own sources in the eastern part of the Andes. The Guaviare is considered the border between the Llanos and the Amazon Rainforest. Its main tributary is the Inírida River.

References

The information in this article is based on a translation of its German equivalent.

External links
 Territorial-Environmental Information System of Colombian Amazon SIAT-AC website

Rivers of Colombia
Orinoco basin